Crossed out B (majuscule: B̵, minuscule: b̵) is letter of the Latin alphabet formed by addition of the bar through the letter B. It is used in Northern Embera and Pilagá languages.

Usage 
The orthography of Northern Embera language used in Panama, the letter represents the voiced bilabial implosive ([ɓ]) sound. In contrast, the orthography of the language used in Colombia, replaces the letter with Ɓ. It is also used in Pilagá language.

The lower case letter was also used as a phonetic symbol, for example by William A. Smalley in his 1968 Manual of articulatory phonetics. In his work Smalley used the letter as a representation of the voiced bilabial fricative ([β]) sound.

References

Bibliography 
Geoffrey K. Pullum, William A. Ladusaw, Phonetic Symbol Guide, Chicago, London, The University of Chicago Press, 1996, 2nd edition.
William A. Smalley, Manual of articulatory phonetics, Tarrytown, Practical Anthropology, 1968
Dadyi Beđeada Ƀʌđia, Guía para docentes, República de Panamá, Ministerio de Educación - Dirección General de Educación, Unidad de Coordinación Técnica para la Ejecución de Programas Especiales en las Áreas Indígenas, Segundo Proyecto de Educación Básica / Banco Mundial, 2006

Latin letters with diacritics